The 1908–09 Challenge Cup was the 13th staging of rugby league's oldest knockout competition, the Challenge Cup.

The cup was won by Wakefield Trinity who beat Hull F.C. 17-0 at Headingley, Leeds on 24 April 1909 in front of a crowd of 23,587. This was the first time Wakefield Trinity had won the cup as well as the club's first appearance in the final.

Before the competition proper started in February 1909, a three round qualifying competition had been held in December 1908 and January 1909, to whittle 32 clubs down to five to join the 26 senior clubs who were exempt from the qualifying rounds. The 32 clubs attempting to qualify included junior teams and most of the newly-formed Welsh senior teams who were in their first season in the Northern Union.

First round
The first round draw was made on 21 January 1909 with the ties played on 27 February 1909.

The single drawn match between Swinton and Rochdale was replayed on 3 March with Swinton winning 3–0.

Second round
The draw for the second round was made on 2 March with the ties played on 13 March.

Swinton were, again, involved in the only drawn tie, but this time they lost the replay 17–3 to Oldham on 16 March.

Third round
The third round produced one all-Yorkshire tie and three Lancashire v Yorkshire ties when the draw was made on 16 March, the ties to be played on 27 March.

The replayed tie was played on 31 March with Wigan prevailing 16–3.

Semi-finals
The semi-final games were played at neutral venues on 10 April, the draw being made on 29 March.

Final
The final was played at Leeds' Headingley stadium on Saturday 24 April 1909.  The official attendance was given as 23,587 but several commentators assessed the attendance as nearer 30,000.

See also
1908–09 Northern Rugby Football Union season

References

Challenge Cup
Challenge Cup